Akash Madhwal (born 25 November 1993) is an Indian cricketer. He made his Twenty20 debut on 8 November 2019, for Uttarakhand in the 2019–20 Syed Mushtaq Ali Trophy. He made his first-class debut on 25 December 2019, for Uttarakhand in the 2019–20 Ranji Trophy. He made his List A debut on 21 February 2021, for Uttarakhand in the 2020–21 Vijay Hazare Trophy.

References

External links
 

1993 births
Living people
Indian cricketers
Uttarakhand cricketers
Place of birth missing (living people)